The siege of Kraków was one of the battles during the Swedish invasion of Polish–Lithuanian Commonwealth (Second Northern War / Deluge). It started on 25 September 1655 and ended on 13 October 1655. Capitulation treatment was signed 4 days later. Polish troops marched out the city on 19 October. The city's defense was led by Kiev's castellan Stefan Czarniecki, while Swedish forces were commanded by king Charles Gustav and Arvid Wittenberg.

Background 
On August 2, 1655, when news of Swedish victories reached the city, the mayor of Kraków, Andrzej Cieniowicz, urged residents to organize defence of the ancient Polish capital. He also collected taxes for employment of 1,000-strong infantry unit. The garrison of Kraków was ordered to watch the city walls and control foreigners, especially Germans, who resided in the city. Furthermore, works on the fortifications were initiated under city engineer Izydor Affaita, and Krzysztof Mieroszewski of the local nobility. To cover the cost of the works, queen Marie Louise Gonzaga handed over some of her jewelry.

On August 27, Bishop of Kraków Piotr Gembicki urged residents to pledge allegiance to the king and to defend the city. The bishop paid for 300 soldiers, who strengthened the garrison, while city council created armed militia, which consisted of students and other residents.

On September 19, King Jan Kazimierz came to Kraków, after the lost Battle of Zarnow. The king brought a few thousand soldiers and levée en masse, but the morale of his army was low. Several members of the nobility abandoned the king, while the army, concentrated at Pradnik, organized itself into a confederation, demanding money and renouncing Hetman, Stanislaw Lanckoronski. On September 20, the Council of the Senate had a meeting, in which allegiance to the king was confirmed. Soon after the meeting, the queen, together with Primate Andrzej Leszczyński left the city.

On September 24, Jan Kazimierz, who had initially planned to stay in Kraków, decided to leave the city as well. Together with Bishop Gembicki, the king at first headed eastwards, to Wojnicz. He then turned south, to Nowy Wiśnicz, Nowy Sącz, and the Polish border.

The siege 

The garrison of Kraków, under Castellan Stefan Czarniecki and colonel of infantry Fromhold Wolff, consisted of some 5,000 men – soldier of the regular army, plus city militia. In order to prepare the defence, Czarniecki burned the suburbs of Kleparz, Biskupie and Garbary, and constructed a system of Earthworks.

On September 25, the Swedes attacked Kazimierz, pillaging it after capture. On the same day, they tried to enter Kraków itself, but Polish counterattack forced them to retreat. On the next day, Charles Gustav ordered an artillery barrage, leaving Arvid Wittenberg with 8,000 soldiers. The Swedish king himself headed with a smaller army towards Wojnicz, where he once again defeated the Poles in the Battle of Wojnicz (October 3). News of this battle quickly reached Kraków, together with Swedish demands for capitulation. Since Polish royal army units, scattered around the city, did not engage themselves in any skirmishes with the Swedes, the defenders of Kraków felt abandoned, without hope of any support. Nevertheless, they continued to fight.

On October 6, Charles Gustav returned to Kraków, and while inspecting Swedish positions, his horse was killed by a Polish bullet, near St. Florian's Gate. As the siege progressed, morale among the defenders sank even lower. Czarniecki, well aware of this, on October 12 initiated negotiations. Further resistance meant destruction of Kraków and starvation of its residents, so on the next day, Czarniecki agreed to capitulate.

Capitulation 
On October 17, a truce was signed with the Swedes. It guaranteed freedom of religion, safety of the Roman Catholic clergy, civil servants and residents, keeping all privileges of the city and its university, and exchange of prisoners of war. The Swedes allowed Polish units to leave Kraków, and march to winter quarters in western Lesser Poland, near Oświęcim, Zator, Sławków and Siewierz. These forces were to remain neutral until November 18. After that date, they were to decide whether to join the Swedish or the Polish king.

On October 19, Czarniecki's forces gathered at Kraków's Main Square. Some 1,800 men with 12 cannons left the city, while Czarniecki was invited by Charles Gustav to a feast. Soon afterwards, 2,500 Swedish infantry plus 500 reiters entered Kraków. The Swedish king came to the city on October 19 in the afternoon. After meeting the city council, Charles Gustav visited Wawel with its Cathedral church. The Swedes immediately broke the agreement, imposing high taxes and robbing churches. Altogether, the booty stolen by the Swedes was estimated at 5 million zlotys.

References 

 Paweł Jasienica, Rzeczpospolita Obojga Narodów. Calamitatis Regnum, 
 Dariusz Milewski, Szwedzi w Krakowie, Mówià wieki, czerwiec 2007.
 Leszek Podhorodecki, Rapier i koncerz, Warszawa 1985, str. 251-260

External links 
Description of map of the city from Archiwum Państwowe w Krakowie.
Another map, city of Kraków in 1781 per Sigr. Rizzi Zanoni, Venezia 1781.
Dariusz Milewski, Szwedzi w Krakowie, Mówią Wieki, 2007-06-08. 

Conflicts in 1655
1655 in Europe
History of Kraków
Battles of the Deluge (history)
Sieges involving Poland
Sieges involving Sweden
1655 in the Polish–Lithuanian Commonwealth